Terror by Satellite is a juvenile science fiction novel, the seventh in Hugh Walters' Chris Godfrey of U.N.E.X.A. series. It was published in 1964, in the UK by Faber and in the US by Criterion Books. It was later published in Portugal by Galeria Panorama, as Pânico no satélite.

Plot summary
Tony Hale, skilled engineer and amateur radio ham, smuggles a home-made transceiver on board an Earth-orbiting satellite during his tour of duty.  This proves invaluable as the commander of the satellite, Hendriks, is a megalomaniac and demands to be made 'Dictator of the World'. To back up this demand, he begins destroying swathes of the Earth's surface using a radiation beam. The only secure link between the Earth and the satellite is Tony's radio.

External links

Terror by Satellite page

1964 British novels
1964 science fiction novels
Chris Godfrey of U.N.E.X.A. series
Faber and Faber books